Alfred Dempsey (8 June 1865 – 1950) was an English footballer who played in the Football League for Stoke.

Career
In a Football League match between Preston North End and Stoke in October 1888, two Stoke players didn't arrive at the ground and Preston reserve player, Dempsey and Bill Smalley were borrowed from the home side. They didn't help Stoke though as North End ran out 7–0 winners.

Career statistics

References

English footballers
Preston North End F.C. players
Stoke City F.C. players
English Football League players
1865 births
1950 deaths
Association football forwards